The Maryland Women's Hall of Fame (MWHF) recognizes significant achievements and statewide contributions made by women who are Maryland-natives or state residents. It was established in 1985 by the Maryland Commission for Women and the Women Legislators of Maryland. Honorees are selected by an independent committee each year and are inducted in March during Women's History Month.

Inductees

Further reading

References

External links

Women's halls of fame
Lists of American women
Women in Maryland
Halls of fame in Maryland
1985 establishments in Maryland